Grigore Costescu (April 11, 1934 – May 2008) was a Romanian basketball player who competed in the 1952 Summer Olympics. He was born in Bucharest. He was part of the Romanian basketball team, which was eliminated in the first round of the 1952 tournament. He played in a match against Italy, which Romania lost 53–39.

References

1934 births
2008 deaths
Basketball players at the 1952 Summer Olympics
Olympic basketball players of Romania
Romanian men's basketball players
Basketball players from Bucharest